Oliver Isak Kass Kawo (born 3 December 2001) is a Syrian footballer who plays as a forward or midfielder for club Dalkurd and the Syria national team.

Early life 
Kass Kawo was born in Sweden to a Syrian father from Al-Hasakah, and a Swedish mother. He began playing football aged five.

Club career 
In March 2021, Kass Kawo left Vasalunds IF to join FC Järfälla. On 1 February 2022, he signed a deal until June 2024 with Danish 1st Division club FC Helsingør after a trial period.

International career 
Having represented Syria internationally at under-23 level, Kass Kawo made his senior debut on 30 November 2021, in a 2021 FIFA Arab Cup game against the United Arab Emirates. He scored his first international goal on 3 December, on his 20th birthday, helping Syria beat Tunisia 2–0 in the same competition.

Style of play 
Kass Kawo is a versatile forward capable of playing in multiple offensive positions.

Career statistics

International 

Scores and results list Syria's goal totally first, score column indicates score after each Kass Kawo goal.

Honours
Syria U23
 AFC U-23 Asian Cup third place: 2022

References

External links
 
 
 Oliver Kass Kawo at lagstatistik.se
 

2001 births
Living people
People from Järfälla Municipality
Sportspeople from Stockholm County
Swedish people of Syrian descent
Syrian people of Swedish descent
Swedish footballers
Syrian footballers
Association football forwards
Association football midfielders
Vasalunds IF players
FC Järfälla players
FC Helsingør players
Division 4 (Swedish football) players
Division 2 (Swedish football) players
Danish 1st Division players
Syria youth international footballers
Syria international footballers
Swedish expatriate footballers
Swedish expatriate sportspeople in Denmark
Syrian expatriate footballers
Syrian expatriate sportspeople in Denmark
Expatriate men's footballers in Denmark